The State Register of Heritage Places is maintained by the Heritage Council of Western Australia. , 1,146 places are heritage-listed in the Town of East Fremantle, of which fifteen are on the State Register of Heritage Places.

List
The Western Australian State Register of Heritage Places, lists the following fifteen state registered places within the Town of East Fremantle:

References

East Fremantle